The 19th Northwest Territories Legislative Assembly in Canada was established by the results of the 2019 Northwest Territories general election on October 1, 2019. 

In the 2019 election, 9 of the 19 MLAs elected were women, a record in both NWT and all of Canada. Previously, the most sitting women MLAs was three. On July 27, following the resignation of Jackson Lafferty and the subsequent by-election victory of Jane Weyallon Armstrong, the Legislature had 10 women to 9 men, and became the first jurisdiction in Canada to have a majority of women legislators.

Membership

Source:

Executive Council of the Northwest Territories

Ministers at present are as follows (current as of July 2021):

References

External links
Official site